Rubus thibetanus, sometimes known as ghost bramble, is a species of deciduous shrub in the genus Rubus, native to western China, where the local Chinese name may be translated into English as Tibetan dewberry. It is xu zang xuan gou zi in transcribed Chinese

Rubus thibetanus is found in Gansu, Shaanxi, Sichuan, and Xizang (Tibet) provinces, to an altitude of 900–2100 meters, usually in dry areas in ravines, thickets, ditches, and on the edges of forests.

Rubus thibetanus grows 2–3 m tall, with reddish-brown, cylindric branchlets, and sparse prickles. Leaves are pinnately compound, triangular over all, appearing rather fern-like. Flowers are white, emerging in June. In August it bears its fruit, which are globular, purplish-black or dark red inedible aggregate fruits ("berries"), 8–10 mm in diameter.

In cultivation in he UK Rubus thibetanus has won the Royal Horticultural Society's Award of Garden Merit.

References

External links
 GBIF entry for Rubus thibetanus
 

thibetanus
Plants described in 1886
Flora of China